The Hoyvík Agreement is a free trade agreement between the Faroe Islands and Iceland.

History
The agreement was signed 31 August 2005 in the town of Hoyvík in the Faroe Islands. The Faroese Løgting ratified the agreement on 2 May 2006 and the Icelandic Alþingi did the same on 3 June.

On 21 August 2006, a statement was made by the annual general meeting of the West Nordic Council that the possibility of extending the agreement to include Greenland (thus creating a West Nordic free trade zone) should be seriously studied. It was noted at Løgting that the agreement could be extended to Norway and Canada in the future.

Content
It is the most extensive free trade agreement that either nation has entered into. It guarantees almost complete freedom of goods, services, persons and capital. It also deals with competition and government subsidies and prohibits any kind of discrimination based on nationality except when it is specially provided for by the agreement. The agreement is unique for Iceland as it the first such agreement establishing free trade in agricultural products, a sector that usually sees a lot of protection from the Icelandic authorities.

A notable exception to the free trade agreement is the special status of the fisheries industry. Pre-existing restrictions on foreign investment in the industry present in both countries will not be abolished.

In addition to free trade, the agreement also provides a framework for increased cooperation between the nations regarding all the common interests of the nations. Especially mentioned fields of cooperation include: culture, education, sports, health care, transportation, communications, tourism, environmental issues, energy and resource management.

See also

Foreign relations of Iceland
Representation of the Faroes, Reykjavík
West Nordic Council

References

External links
The draft legislation for ratifying the agreement, includes the full text of the agreement in Icelandic
A press release from the Faroese government about the signing of the agreement (in Faroese)
A West Nordic free trade area possible (Icelandic)

Free trade agreements
Economy of Iceland
Economy of the Faroe Islands
Hoyvík
Denmark–Iceland relations
Treaties of Iceland
Treaties of the Faroe Islands
Treaties concluded in 2005
Treaties entered into force in 2006
2005 in the Faroe Islands